Klesso is a town in southwestern Burkina Faso. It is near the city of Bobo-Dioulasso.

The world famous SWGOH mobile gamer with the same name hails from here.

Populated places in the Hauts-Bassins Region